Have a Nice Life is an American post-punk band founded in Connecticut in 2000 by Dan Barrett and Tim Macuga.

History
Have a Nice Life was formed in 2000 by Dan Barrett and Tim Macuga of Connecticut. They have mentioned the likes of My Bloody Valentine, Joy Division, New Order, Earth, Sunn O))), Xasthur, Lurker of Chalice, Nine Inch Nails, Swans, Sisters of Mercy, Kraftwerk, and the philosophy of Friedrich Nietzsche as influences on their music.

Their debut album, Deathconsciousness, has received critical acclaim since its release in 2008. It initially did not receive much recognition but gained traction through discussions on online communities and word of mouth. The band have since developed a cult audience as a result of Deathconsciousness' online popularity.

The band followed up with the extended play Time of Land, released as a free download in 2010.

On January 27, 2014, Have a Nice Life released their second studio album The Unnatural World. According to Metacritic, the album has received generally favorable reviews.

On November 8, 2019, the band released their third studio album Sea of Worry.

Outside of music, Barrett runs a real estate marketing agency and Macuga is a high school English/History teacher.

Discography

Studio albums
 Deathconsciousness (2008)
 The Unnatural World (2014)
 Sea of Worry (2019)

Compilation album
 Voids (2009)
 Voids Remastered (2023)

Extended play
 Time of Land (2010)
 Time of Land Remastered (2021)

Demos 
 Have a Nice Life vs. You (2002)
 Powers of Ten (2006)

Singles 
 "The Big Gloom" (2006), released promotionally as a free download on the band's Myspace account.
 "Bloodhail" (2008), released promotionally as a free download on the band's Myspace account.
 "I Don't Love" (2008), released promotionally as a free download on the band's Myspace account.
 "Sea of Worry" (2019)
 "Lords of Tresserhorn" (2019)
 "Science Beat" (2019)
 "Sisyphus - Demo" (2023)

Live album
 Live at The Stone NYC (2010)

See also

 Giles Corey (band)
 List of ambient artists
 List of shoegazing musicians
 List of post-punk bands
 List of post-rock bands
 Music of Connecticut

References

External links
 "Have A Nice Life".  Enemies List Home Recordings.  Retrieved February 25, 2013.

2000 establishments in Connecticut
21st-century American musicians
American ambient music groups
American post-punk music groups
American post-rock groups
Musical groups established in 2000
Rock music groups from Connecticut
American shoegaze musical groups